USS Hammerhead (SSN-663), a , was the second ship of the United States Navy to be named for the hammerhead shark, a voracious fish found in warm seas, with a curious hammerlike head.

Construction and commissioning
The contract to build Hammerhead was awarded to Newport News Shipbuilding and Dry Dock Company at Newport News, Virginia, on 28 May 1964 and her keel was laid down there on 29 November 1965.  She was launched on 14 April 1967, sponsored by Mrs. O. Clark Fisher, and commissioned on 28 June 1968.

Service history

In 1981, she won the Marjorie Sterrett Battleship Fund Award for the Atlantic Fleet.

Tom Clancy, author of the 1984 novel The Hunt for Red October, was given a brief ride into port aboard Hammerhead in the late 1980s prior to the filming of the 1990 film adaptation of the novel, also entitled The Hunt for Red October. After spotting a mounted roll of toilet paper in Hammerheads sonar room used for wiping grease pencil markings off the screens in the rooms, he proclaimed his intention to write the contrasting image of the low-technology toilet paper mount among all of the complicated electronics and other equipment aboard Hammerhead into the film. True to his word, he did.

Decommissioning and disposal
Hammerhead, under the command of Commander Forrest Novacek, was decommissioned on 5 April 1995 and stricken from the Naval Vessel Register on the same day. Her scrapping via the Nuclear-Powered Ship and Submarine Recycling Program at Puget Sound Naval Shipyard in Bremerton, Washington, was completed on 22 November 1995.

References 

NavSource Online: Submarine Photo Archive Hammerhead (SSN-663)

 

Sturgeon-class submarines
Cold War submarines of the United States
Nuclear submarines of the United States Navy
1967 ships
Ships built in Newport News, Virginia